The Eagle and the Hawk is a 1950 American Western film directed by Lewis R. Foster and written by Lewis R. Foster and Daniel Mainwaring. The film stars John Payne, Rhonda Fleming, Dennis O'Keefe, Thomas Gomez, Fred Clark and Frank Faylen. The film was released on May 30, 1950, by Paramount Pictures.

Plot
In 1863, Governor Lubbock (Grandon Rhodes) of Texas has asked Todd Croyden (John Payne) of the Texas Rangers to spring a Union Army spy from a Confederate camp and bring him back. France is trying to seize Mexico and the governor is aiding the latter's defense effort. Guns and ammo are being stolen in Corales, so the governor wants the Ranger and the spy, Whitney Randolph (Dennis O'Keefe), to investigate. Croyden doesn't much care for Randolph, who wins his horse and harmonica gambling on the trail.

While crossing the Rio Grande, they end up held at gunpoint by a woman, Madeline Danzeeger (Rhonda Fleming), whose wagon is stuck. After helping her, they learn that a former German army officer also named Danzeeger, likely her father, is working with a Mexican general, Liguras (Thomas Gomez), for big money. Croyden locates the missing munitions at Basil Danzeeger's (Fred Clark) ranch, but foreman Red Hyatt (Frank Faylen) is suspicious of him. A fire set by Croyden and Randolph destroys the gunpowder, but Madeline turns out to be Basil's wife and takes them prisoner. Red Hyatt tries to kill Croyden by tying him to two wild horses. Randolph dies while saving him.

Madeline has a change of heart, having fallen in love with Croyden, and is shot by her husband. Basil and Liguras end up in a fight to the death fatal to both, and, luckily, it appears Madeline will recover.

Cast
 John Payne as Capt. Todd Croyden
 Rhonda Fleming as Mrs. Madeline Danzeeger
 Dennis O'Keefe as Whitney Randolph
 Thomas Gomez as Gen. Liguras (The Hawk) 
 Fred Clark as Basil Danzeeger
 Frank Faylen as Red' Hyatt, Danzeegers Foreman
 Eduardo Noriega as Roberto the Cobbler
 Grandon Rhodes as Texas Gov. Lubbock
 Walter Reed as Jones

Production
Pine-Thomas were so pleased with the film they wanted to reteam Payne, Fleming and O'Keefe in more movies as a version of the "Road To..." movies.

References

External links
 
 
 
 

1950 films
1950 Western (genre) films
American Western (genre) films
Fiction set in 1863
Films adapted into comics
Films directed by Lewis R. Foster
Films set in Mexico
Paramount Pictures films
Second French intervention in Mexico films
1950s English-language films
1950s American films